Christine Nakaseeta Binayisa Kitumba is a Ugandan lawyer and judge. She served as a Justice of the Supreme Court of Uganda, from July 2009. Her tenure was expected to conclude in 2015. In July 2017, she was requested to continue serving, in order to alleviate a shortage of justices on the country's highest court. As of September 2017, she served on the court on an extended contract. Before her appointment on the Supreme Court, she was a member of the Court of Appeal of Uganda.

Background and education
She was born in the Buganda Region of Uganda. After attending primary school locally, she was admitted to Trinity College Nabbingo, where she finished  with a High School Diploma. She has a Bachelor of Laws obtained from Dar es Salaam University, Tanzania a public university that was established in 1961. Has a Master of Laws, obtained from The Queen's University Belfast in 1969.

On the Supreme Court of Uganda
In August 2015, Justice Christine Kitumba was part of the 6-1 majority which held that it was unconstitutional for the family of the man to demand a refund of the bride price, from the family of the woman, in case of a divorce. However the demand of bride price before a traditional marriage was ruled constitutional.

See also
Judiciary of Uganda

References

External links
Parliament Vets new Supreme Court Judges As of 20 August 2009.

Ugandan judges
Year of birth missing (living people)
Living people
Ugandan women judges
People educated at Trinity College Nabbingo
University of Dar es Salaam alumni
Alumni of Queen's University Belfast